Vorozole (developmental code name R-76713; former tentative brand name Rizivor) is a triazole based competitive inhibitor of the aromatase enzyme. It underwent clinical testing for evaluation for use as an antineoplastic agent; however it was withdrawn from testing when no difference was detected in the duration of median survival as compared to the progestational agent megestrol acetate and research instead focused on the other third generation aromatase inhibitors anastrozole, letrozole and exemestane.

References 

Aromatase inhibitors
Benzotriazoles
Chloroarenes
Triazoles